The Meatball Shop is a New York City based restaurant owned and operated by native New Yorkers Daniel Holzman and Michael Chernow, who met as teenagers when they worked together as delivery boys at the New York vegan restaurant Candle Cafe.

Overview 
Daniel Holzman is the “executive chef” at The Meatball Shop. He attended The Culinary Institute of America. and is an alum of Le Bernardin, San Francisco’s Fifth Floor, and Aqua.

Michael Chernow runs the creative side of the business, focusing on marketing and branding.  He has worked extensively in restaurants in New York and Los Angeles.  He is a graduate of the French Culinary Institute, where he earned degrees in culinary arts and restaurant management.

Locations
There are now three locations total in New York, located in Hells Kitchen, Williamsburg, and Upper East Side, down from a high of eight locations at its peak in popularity. Bad reviews and inconsistent guest experience are the most common reasons for a meatball shop location to close.

Cookbook 
Michael and Daniel released The Meatball Shop Cookbook, published by Ballantine Books, on November 1, 2011. It was co-written by Lauren Deen.

References 

Restaurants in Manhattan
Upper East Side